Darkling beetle is the common name for members of the beetle family Tenebrionidae. The number of species in the Tenebrionidae is estimated at more than 20,000 and the family is cosmopolitan in distribution.

Taxonomy
Tenebrio is the Latin generic name that Carl Linnaeus assigned to some flour beetles in his 10th edition of Systema Naturae 1758-59. The name means "lover of darkness"; the English language term 'darkling' means "characterised by darkness or obscurity"; see also English 'tenebrous', figuratively "obscure, gloomy."

Numerous Tenebrionidae species do inhabit dark places; however, there are many species in genera such as Stenocara and Onymacris, which are active by day and inactive at night.

The family covers a varied range of forms, such that classification presents great difficulties. These eleven subfamilies were listed in the 2021 review by Bouchard, Bousquet, et al., updating a similar catalog from 2005.
 Alleculinae Laporte, 1840
 Blaptinae Leach, 1815
 Diaperinae Latreille, 1802
 Kuhitangiinae G.S. Medvedev, 1962
 Lagriinae Latreille, 1825
 Nilioninae Oken, 1843
 Phrenapatinae Solier, 1834
 Pimeliinae Latreille, 1802
 Stenochiinae Kirby, 1837
 Tenebrioninae Latreille, 1802
 Zolodininae Watt, 1975

Ongoing phylogenetic studies are showing that some taxonomic changes are needed. For instance the tribal classification of tribe Pedinini has recently been altered.

The misspelling "Terebrionidae" occurs frequently enough to be easily overlooked. The error appears to have no particular significance, but to be the product of misreadings, mis-scans and mis-typings.

The oldest known member of the family is Jurallecula from the Late Jurassic Karabastau Formation of Kazakhstan, assigned to the subfamily Alleculinae.

Characteristics
The Tenebrionidae may be identified by a combination of features, including:
 Their 11-segmented antennae that may be filiform, moniliform or weakly clubbed
 First abdominal sternite is entire and not divided by the hind coxae
 Eyes notched by a frontal ridge
 The tarsi have four segments in the hind pair and five in the fore and mid legs (5-5-4), tarsal claws are simple

Biology and ecology
Tenebrionid beetles occupy ecological niches in mainly deserts and forests as plant scavengers. Most species are generalistic omnivores, and feed on decaying leaves, rotting wood, fresh plant matter, dead insects, and fungi as larvae and adults. Several genera, including Bolitotherus, are specialized fungivores which feed on polypores. Many of the larger species are flightless, and those that are capable, such as T. molitor, often rarely do so.

The larvae, known as mealworms or false wireworms, are usually fossorial, heavily sclerotized and nocturnal. They may possibly be an important resource for certain invertebrates and small mammals. However, the adults of many species have chemical defenses and are relatively protected against predators. Adults of most species, except grain pests, have slow metabolisms, and live long lives compared to other insects, ranging from approximately six months to two years.

Some species live in intensely dry deserts such as the Namib, and have evolved adaptions by which they collect droplets of fog that deposit on their elytra. As the droplets accumulate the water drains down the beetles' backs to their mouthparts, where they swallow it.

Humans spread some species such that they have become cosmopolitan, such as Tribolium castaneum, the red flour beetle, which was spread through grain products.

Notable species
The larval stages of several species are cultured as feeder insects for captive insectivores or as laboratory subjects:
 Tenebrio molitor is commonly used to feed terrestrial amniotes kept in terraria.
 Tribolium castaneum is a laboratory animal useful as a model organism, especially in studies of intragenomic conflict and population ecology.
 Zophobas morio, or superworm, is valued as a feed for captive reptiles; it contains less chitin than Tenebrio molitor.
 Alphitobius diaperinus, lesser mealworm
 Many tenebrionids are pests of cereal and flour silos and other storage facilities, including T. castaneum, other Tribolium species such as Tribolium confusum and Tribolium destructor, and Gnathocerus cornutus.
 In southwestern North America, species of the genus Eleodes (particularly E. obscurus) are well known as "pinacate beetles" or "desert stink beetles".
 Several genera, such as Stenocara and Onymacris, are of interest in ecological studies of arid conditions and their associated adaptations.
 Ulomoides dermestoides, known as "chinese weevil", "peanut beetle", "cancer beetle", or "asthma beetle", is eaten in Argentina where it is thought to be a treatment for cancer, asthma, and other illnesses.

Gallery

References

External links
 Tenebrionidae.net- information and pictures about darkling beetles

Beetle families